Space mirrors are satellites that are designed to change the amount of solar radiation that impacts the Earth as a form of climate engineering. Since the conception of the idea in 1923, 1929, 1957 and 1978 by physicist Hermann Oberth and in the 1980s by other scientists, space mirrors have mainly been theorized as a way to deflect sunlight to counter global warming and was seriously considered in the 2000s. 

There have been several proposed implementations of the space mirror concept but none have been implemented thus far other than the Znamya project by Russia due to logistical concerns and challenges of deployment.

General concept

History 
The concept of the construction of space mirrors as a method of climate engineering dates back to the years 1923,1929, 1957 und 1978 by the physicist Hermann Oberth and the 1980s by other scientists. In 1923, Hermann Oberth first described his space mirrors with a diameter of 100 to 300 km in his book „Die Rakete zu den Planetenräumen", which are said to consist of a grid network of individually adjustible facets.
Space mirrors in orbit around the earth, as designed by Hermann Oberth, are intended to focus sunlight on indiviual regions oft he earth’s surface or deflect it into space so that the solar radiation is weakened in a specifically controlled manner for individual regions on the earth’s surface.

It is therefore not a question oft he weakening oft he solar radiation on the entire exposed surface oft he earth, as would be the case when considering the establishment of shading areas at Lagrange point between the sun and the earth.
These giant mirrors in orbit could be used to illuminate individual cities, as a mens of protection against natural disasters, to control weather and climate, to create addional living space for tens of billions of people, Hermann Oberth writes. The fact that one could influence the trajectories of he barometric high and low pressure areas with these spatial mirrors seemed most important to Oberth.

Other scientists proposed in the 1980s to cool Venus’ climate to provide for a theoretical future where humans occupy other planets. In 1989, James Early, working at the Lawrence Livermore National Laboratory, proposed using a "space shade"  in diameter orbiting at Lagrangian Point L1. He estimated the cost at between one and ten trillion US dollars and suggested manufacturing it on the moon using moon rock.

Space mirrors were also proposed at the "Response Options to Rapid or Severe Climate Change" round-table meeting organized by the President's Climate Change Technology Program in September 2001. Lowell Wood, a senior staff scientist at the Lawrence Livermore National Laboratory proposed stationing one or more wire-mesh "mirrors" in orbit to deflect sunlight back into space or to filter it. Wood calculated that deflecting 1% of sunlight would restore climatic stability, and that would require either a single mirror 600,000 square miles (1,600,000 km2) in area or several smaller ones. Wood had been researching the idea for more than ten years but considered it so infeasible that it should only be a back-up plan for solving the global warming problem.

In January 2007, The Guardian reported that the US government recommended that research on sunlight deflection, including space mirrors, be continued in line with the next United Nations Report on Climate Change. In addition to the space mirror, suggested sunlight-reducing techniques included launching thousands of highly reflective balloons and pumping sulphate droplets into the upper atmosphere to emulate volcanic emissions.

Daniel Schrag of Harvard University and David Keith of the University of Calgary organized a climate engineering conference in November 2007. The research community’s consensus was that it was worth studying such ideas further despite their high cost, the doubtful feasibility of some ideas including the space mirror, and the risk of their distracting attention from reduction of greenhouse gas emissions.

Purpose 
Space mirrors are designed either to increase or decrease the amount of energy that reaches a planet from the sun with the goal of changing the impact of UV radiation; or, to reflect light onto or deflect light off of a planet in order to change the sun’s lighting conditions. Space mirrors are an example of Solar Radiation Management (SRM), which is a "theoretical approach to reducing some of the impacts of climate change by reflecting a small amount of inbound sunlight back out into space." The concept is to reflect enough sunlight to reduce the Earth's temperature therefore balancing out the warming effect of greenhouse gases.

Climate engineering 
Most past proposals for the development of space mirrors are specifically to slow the progression of climate change on Earth. Deflecting a small amount of the sun’s energy from the Earth’s atmosphere would reduce the amount of energy entering the ecosystem of the Earth.

Sunlight reflection/deflection 
Some proposals for the development of space mirrors also focus on the ability to change localized lighting conditions on the surface of the Earth by shading certain sections or reflecting sunlight onto small sections. Doing this could allow for differentiated climates in local areas and potentially additional sunlight for enhanced crop growth. A first practical attempt at reflecting sunlight was made in the 1990s by the Russian Agency project name Znamya.

Debate 
Climate experts have cautioned that geoengineering proposals like space mirrors, while potentially being able to cool the planet, would not provide any benefit for other climate related problems like high acidity levels in the ocean due to the build up of carbon. In the past, many scientists have also resisted the idea of using geoengineering to curb climate change, as the risks of causing adverse effects were too great and they worried it would encourage people to continue to use fossil fuels that contribute to that change.

Policy 
At times, politicians have been more eager to discuss climate engineering and space mirror proposals than scientists have been to think about implementing them. Politicians in the administrations of George W. Bush and Barack Obama have discussed and proposed funding for US-based space mirrors proposals. Scientists, however, are still worried about the significant risks. Matthew Watson, of the University of Bristol, led a £5m research study into the potential adverse effects of climate engineering and said, "We are sleepwalking to a disaster with climate change. Cutting emissions is undoubtedly the thing we should be focusing on but it seems to be failing. Although geoengineering is terrifying to many people, and I include myself in this, [its feasibility and safety] are questions that have to be answered". University of Oxford Professor Steve Rayner is also worried about the adverse effects of climate engineering, especially the potential for people to be too positive about the effects and stop trying to slow the actual problem of climate change. Though, he says there is a potential reason to doing climate engineering: "People decry doing [climate engineering] as a band aid, but band aids are useful when you are healing".

Russian implementation 

The Znamya project was a series of orbital mirror experiments in the 1990s that intended to beam solar power to Earth by reflecting sunlight. It consisted of three experiments the Znamya 1, Znamya 2 experiment, and the failed Znamya 2.5. The Znamya 1 was a ground experiment that never was launched.  The Znamya 2 was the first successful launch the Znamya project had. It was attached to the unmanned Progress M-15. The deployment resulted in a bright light of a width of 5km and with the intensity of a Full Moon being shined. The Znamya 3 was proposed but never acted upon because of the failure of the Znamya 2.5.  The project was abandoned by the Russian Federal Space Agency after the failed deployment of the Znamya 2.5.

Scientific theory

Geoengineering and climate change 
Geoengineering research efforts to mitigate or reverse the changes to the Earth’s climate can be separated into two different categories, carbon dioxide removal and solar radiation management. Carbon dioxide is the main source for climate change on Earth as it causes an increase in the atmospheric temperature and acidification of the oceans. Although CO2 removal from the atmosphere would reverse climate changes thus far, removing carbon is a slower and more difficult process compared to solar radiation management.

Solar radiation management works to directly mitigate the effects of atmospheric warming due to the burning of fossil fuels and subsequent release of greenhouse gases. Space mirrors fall under this category of geoengineering as they work to block solar radiation and lower the warming effects from the sun.

Research and development proposals 
The physicist Hermann Oberth followed his first suggestion in 1923 with further publications, in which he took into account the technical progress achieved up to that point: 1929 „Ways to Spaceflight“, 1957 „Menschen im Weltraum. Neue Projekte für Raketen- und Raumfahrt“ (People in Space. New Projects for Rocket and Space) and 1978 „Der Weltraumspiegel“ (The Space Mirror). For cost reasons, Hermann Oberth’s concept envisages that the components should be produced from lunar minerals on the moon, because its lower gravitational pull requires less energy to launch the components into lunar Orbit. In addition, the earth's atmosphere is not burdened by many rocket launches. From the lunar surface, the components would be launched into the lunar orbit by an electromagnetic lunar slingshot and „stacked“ at a 60° libration point. From there, the components could be tranported into orbit with the electric spaceships he had designed with litle recoil, and there they would be assembled into mirrors with a diameter of 100 to 300 km. In 1978 he estimated that the realization could be expected between 2018 and 2038.

In the 1980s there were more theoretical proposals for space mirrors as scientists attempted to discover a feasible way to partially reflect sunlight and slow down the warming of the Earth’s atmosphere using space mirrors. In 1989, engineer James Early proposed a 2,000 km glass shield. The glass shield would need to be constructed on the Moon using moon rock due to its sheer mass. Lowell Wood, a researcher at the Lawrence Livermore National Laboratory, proposed sending a single, massive mirror into orbit at Lagrange point L1, approximately one million miles away from Earth. While orbiting at the Lagrange point 1, the space mirror would be able to remain in orbit without any additional energy supplies and continue to block sunlight. In 2006, Roger Angel, a researcher at the University of Arizona, proposed sending millions of smaller space mirrors as opposed to one large mirror to reduce costs and increase feasibility as a single mirror would need to be approximately 600,000 square miles to block just one percent of sunlight.

Star Technology and Research looked to create a system of space mirrors which both blocked sunlight from reaching Earth and provided another source of clean energy for Earth. The company proposed launching several hundred space mirror spacecraft into orbit closer to Earth. These spacecraft would orbit around the Earth’s equator and could be remotely controlled to steer around Earth while covered with space mirrors that reflect sunlight. Additionally, the spacecraft would be equipped with solar panels which could collect some of the sunlight as well and send the captured energy back to be used back down on Earth.

Andrew Yang, a Democratic US presidential candidate in 2020, revived the space mirror movement with his expandable space mirror initiative. According to Yang’s proposal, US researchers need to create satellites, similar to those already in orbit, equipped with retractable space mirrors with the ability to deploy and retract quickly and easily in case of an emergency.

Tharshan Maheswaran and Sebastian Fix from the University of Stuttgart, Institute of Space Systems describe a roadmap for the development, construction and transport of an international planetary sun shield (IPSS) at the Lagrange point 1 in 2021, which will also be a photovoltaic  plant could be. Here, too, as with Hermann Oberth, production on the moon, the use of an electromagnetic moon slingshot (lunar coilgun) and the transport of the components from the moon to the Lagrange point 1 between the earth and the sun are discussed by means of electric spaceships (alternatively with sun sails) assumed. The authors refer to the many international activities and the chance to put the sun shield into operation by 2060.

Development

Challenges 
After the Russian Znamya space mirror experiment in 1993, there has not been any active development of space mirrors due to the sheer challenges involved in their deployment and the potential consequences that follow their operation.

Deployment logistics 
The deployment and maintenance of a fleet of small space mirrors that can create a shade of around 100,000 kilometers in space would include necessary factors such as energy, construction, transportation, and ground support operations. Overall, the estimated cost of constructing and sending a fleet of space mirrors to space is around 750 billion dollars. If the space mirrors are able to achieve a 50-year lifetime, the annual maintenance cost estimates to around 100 billion dollars. Furthermore, if any individual satellite needed to be replaced at the end of their lifetime, the costs of the entire operation would amount to 5 trillion dollars.

The deployment of either one large space mirror or a fleet of smaller mirror will also have to take into consideration of the millions of space debris within the Earth’s orbit. Most debris is small, weighing around 1 gram. However, depending on their speed, such debris can be catastrophic for satellites if they were to collide. Therefore, orbital satellites would need to maneuver out of the path of tracked space debris from the space mirror. Additionally, if one very large space mirror were to be deployed, its massive surface area will be a very large target for space debris. Therefore, maneuvering hundreds of space mirrors or one very large space mirror will prove to be very difficult due to the space debris and the potential size of the space mirror.

Unintended climate change 
The direct reflection of solar radiation away from the Earth may have certain adverse effects on the climate. As the Earth is exposed to less solar radiation, the planet will cool down, but this might result in unpredictable weather patterns. An overall drop in global temperature may affect the hydrological cycle and could increase the intensity of droughts and floods. Furthermore, the change of temperature and climate may also negatively impact the cultivation of crops. As a result, the reflection of solar radiation could adversely affect around 65% of the global population.

See also 
 Climate engineering
 Hermann Oberth
 Space-based solar power
 Znamya
 Sun gun
Planetary engineering

References

Climate change mitigation
Climate engineering